Ajah is a town in Eti-Osa local government area in Lagos State in Nigeria. It encompasses Addo, Langbasa, Badore, Ajiwe, VGC, etc. Ajah has been linked to shootings and clashes which resulted in death and loss of property.

Shootings and Clashes in Ajah, Lagos 
Ajah has witnessed some shootings and clashes. There was a shooting on Tuesday, December 6, 2022, that involved the men of Ajah Division, Lagos. This resulted in the death of a young man named Gafaru Buraimoh, who lived in Happy Land Estate, Ajah. He was shot at, by an Inspector of Police in Ajah. However, the Command visited the family and condoled them while promising to bring justice for the death of their family member.

In another incident, a bullion van with millions of naira was snatched on Ado road in Ajah, Lagos by armed robbers. There were shootings that left one man dead on the road while the robbers successfully opened the bullion van and took away the money.  

There was a cult clash in Sangotedo area of Ajah, Lagos where an eye witness stated that “about 10 persons were beheaded in the clash between suspected members of Eiye Confraternity and an unidentified rival cult." The Police were sent over to look for more victims and restore calm in the area.  

There were also clashes between the Ajah community and Ilaje which caused the harmony between the two communities to become enemies. The conflicts have resulted in the burning of houses, armed robbery, raping of women, and shootings. The Police has called both parties to sign a peace accord.

Besides, 77 persons were arrested by The Lagos State Police Command in Chief Lasisi Baale Close, Oke Ira, in Ajah, Lagos after the cult clashes and the killing of one person. The clash was said to have been caused by the Aiye and Eiye confraternities. Many people were injured.

Flood in Ajah, Lagos 
Ajah is a flood-prone area in Lagos. Heavy rain floods the area destroying properties and causing people to stay indoors. Even the homes are flooded.  Hence, homes and roads in Ajah and other areas in Lagos are under the climate change struggles. People have reported missing during floods while some others have been rescued.

In the Lekki Palm City Estate, Ajah, Lagos, the residents went into a protest where they blocked the roads that lead to the estate to register their annoyance on the developer who they said caused the flooding of the area by not obeying the drainage alignment. It was claimed that the housing project by Henry Montego Construction is against the urban planning as they built on a drainage system This caused flooding in the estate through the streets and the homes. The residents walked the streets on rain booths and the bath water no longer get to the drainage.

History
Ajah was founded by the Odugbese Abereoje who accommodated Ogunsemo and Ojupon families in the 16th century. The Odugbese Abereoje were the first settler and which major occupation was fishing. They appointed the Baale (Someone that is always around), while they were away in the river fishing to see to the affairs of the community in absentia. The Baale was from Ogunsemo. Ajah land is divided to 42 Chiefs and 10 king makers. The 11th Baale of Ajah, Chief Murisiku Alani Oseni Adedunloye Ojupon was installed on 1st October 2009.

Ajah is occupied by Ajah and Ilaje people who migrated to Ajah after being displaced from Maroko and Moba. The Ajahs and Ijajes have long been embroiled in intercommunity wars. Ajah is also surrounded by the border of water which links the Lagos lagoon to the Atlantic Ocean.

Notable institutions
Lagos Business School
Pan-Atlantic University
Lagos State Model College Badore
Victoria Garden City

Gallery

References

Eti-Osa
Populated places in Lagos State